Carrington is a village and civil parish in the Metropolitan Borough of Trafford, Greater Manchester, England. Historically a part of Cheshire, the village is west of  the Greater Manchester Urban Area, and includes several industrial sites.

History
Several derivations of the name Carrington have been suggested, all from Old English. The name may mean "estate associated with a man called Cara"; alternatively, the first part of the name may be derived from caring, meaning "tending or herding" or cring, which means "river bend", so either "place associated with herding", or "settlement by a river bend". In the 12th century, Carrington was known as Carrintona.

Industry
Carrington has a large gas and chemical works, which produce gases by fractional distillation of liquid air. It used to be the site of a Shell Chemicals refinery, which produced polythene and polystyrene.

Carrington Power Station was on the south bank of the Manchester Ship Canal. Building work commenced in 1947, although land for the site was acquired in 1916. It opened in 1956, was decommissioned in the late 1980s, and demolished using explosives in 1991, having stood empty for several years.  All that remains today is a large 400 kV switching station. The station had its own railway spur from the Glazebrook to Stockport Tiviot Dale line, evidence of which can still be seen today from the gates where the line crossed Manchester Road.

In 2007, Bridestones Developments acquired planning permission for a new CCGT (Combined Cycle Gas Turbine) power station, to be built on the same site as the old power station.  Construction of the new power station began in 2013 and was completed in the Autumn of 2016. The new power station will generate three times the energy as the old coal-fired power station, will occupy only half of the space of the old site and will emit only half of the carbon dioxide. Around 600 people have been involved in its construction and when it is finally operation there will be around 40 staff employed at the power station. The new power station will generate up to 880MW of electricity which is enough to supply approximately one million homes. Some of the parts for the new plant were so large that they were transported to the site via the Manchester ship canal

Future
The "New Carrington" site, including the former Shell site, has been allocated for development in the Greater Manchester Spatial Framework. The site could provide 11,500 dwellings and 750,000 sqm employment floorspace.

Sport
Manchester United have the Trafford Training Centre and Bury formerly had the Carrington Training Centre on Carrington Moss, as does Sale Sharks Rugby Club.

Geography

Demography
At the 2001 UK census, Carrington had a total population of 396. For every 100 females, there were 110.6 males. The average household size was 2.62. Of those aged 16–74 in Carrington, 53.3% had no academic qualifications or one GCSE, higher than the figures for all of Trafford (40.8%) and in England (45.5%). According to the census, 1.75% were unemployed and 34.39% were economically inactive. 21.72% of the population were under the age of 16 and 6.31% were aged 75 and over; the mean age of the people of Carrington was 37.24. 66.41% of residents described their health as "good".

Population change

See also

Listed buildings in Carrington, Greater Manchester

References
Notes

Bibliography

External links

 Carrington Power Station

Villages in Greater Manchester
Civil parishes in Greater Manchester
Geography of Trafford